Pradip Paudel is a Nepali politician and a Central Committee Member of Nepali Congress Party. He was elected as the central committee member of the party with top 5 votes in the 13th General Convention of Nepali Congress. Paudel is from Tanahun, and began his political career with the Nepal Student Union, the student wing of the Nepali Congress. He was a member of the Nepali Congress Central Committee, accepting the appointment from Sushil Koirala on September 17, 2014.

Biography
Paudel started his political life from Amrit Campus as a Nepal Student Union leader. He was elected as a Free Student Union president in 1996. Between 2000 and 2002, Paudel served on the central committee of the Nepal Student Union. He was vice president of Nepal Student Union for three terms between 2002 and 2007, after which he served as president of the Nepal Student Union from 2007 to 2012.

Paudel was the candidate for the Provincial Assembly of Gandaki Province from Tanahun-2(A). He lost the office by five votes to Asha Koirala of the Communist Party of Nepal (Maoist Centre), and protested the result claiming the elections were rigged.

He is seen in the fore front leading movements by Nepal Student Union.

Paudel was key youth figure in the front line along with another youth leader Gagan Thapa and former prime minister Girija Prasad Koirala in 2006 Nepalese revolution.

In the 2022 Nepalese general election, he was elected as the member of the 2nd Federal Parliament of Nepal.

Central Committee Member  
Paudel was appointed Central Committee Member of Nepali Congress by Party President Sher Bahadur Deuba. He took part in 14th general convention of Nepali Congress as the candidate of General Secretary but he lost the election. However in 13th general convention he was elected as Central Committee Member with 1709 votes. He was a member of the committee drafting amendments in party's constitution.

See also
Arjun Narasingha K.C.
Bal Bahadur K.C.

References 

Living people
Nepali Congress politicians from Gandaki Province
21st-century Nepalese politicians
Nepal MPs 2022–present
1975 births